Church View is a village located in the province of Saint George, Barbados. Church View is located about 15km from Bridgetown. It is surrounded by Boarded Hall, Pothouse and Gall Hill.

References 

Populated places in Barbados